This is a list of the weekly Canadian RPM magazine number one Top Singles chart of 1975.

See also
1975 in music

List of Billboard Hot 100 number ones of 1975
List of Cashbox Top 100 number-one singles of 1975

References
Notes

External links
 Read about RPM Magazine at the AV Trust
 Search RPM charts here at Library and Archives Canada

1975 in Canadian music
Canada Singles
1975